Claire L. Babineaux-Fontenot (born in 1964) is the CEO of Feeding America, a national foodbank across the United States. In 2020, Time named her among the 100 most influential people in the world.

Early life and education
Born in Opelousas, Louisiana, Babineaux-Fontenot attended the University of Southwestern Louisiana, Southern University Law Center, and Southern Methodist University's Dedman School of Law. Growing up, her parents Warren and Mary Alice Babineaux cared for over 100 children through a combination of birth, adoption and fostering. Her parents were eventually inducted into the National Adoption Hall of Fame in 2008.

Career
After graduating from college, Babineaux-Fontenot spent 13 years in executive roles at Walmart, including executive vice president of finance and treasurer, and held leadership positions at Adams and Reese, LLP, and PwC. She was also the assistant secretary for the state Office of Legal Affairs and administrative law judge for the Louisiana Department of Civil Service. After undergoing treatment for her cancer in 2015, Babineaux-Fontenot left Walmart to "grant her the time to glean some insight on how to best use her voice to make a positive impact on the lives of other men and women with cancer."

In 2018, Babineaux-Fontenot was named CEO of the board of directors for Feeding America. During the COVID-19 pandemic, Time named her among the 100 most influential people in the world. She also joined the New York Life Board of Directors.

Personal life
Babineaux-Fontenot and her husband, Barry Fontenot, have two children together and reside in Springdale, Arkansas. She is Catholic.

References

Living people
1964 births
American women chief executives
American nonprofit chief executives
University of Louisiana at Lafayette alumni
Southern University Law Center alumni
Southern Methodist University alumni
21st-century American women
African-American Catholics